Russia–Uganda relations are the bilateral foreign relations between the two countries, Russia and Uganda. Russia has an embassy in Kampala and Uganda has an embassy in Moscow.

Bilateral relations
The Soviet Union established diplomatic relations with Uganda on October 11–12, 1962. In 1964, the USSR and Uganda signed a trade agreement and an agreement on economic and technical cooperation, which provided for a loan of 14 million rubles to Uganda.  Registered dynamic political dialogue.

In June 2004, Ugandan President Yoweri Museveni had a brief conversation with Russian President Vladimir Putin  at Sea Island, the summit of the G8. In June 2008, Russian Deputy Minister of Foreign Affairs Andrey Denisov visited Kampala and signed a Memorandum of Consultations between the Ministries of Foreign Affairs of Russia and Uganda.
The most active bilateral relations began to develop in the last two years. In August 2009, Ugandan President Yoweri Museveni was in Moscow on a private visit. He held talks with Foreign Minister Sergey Lavrov, the Russian Chamber of Commerce and Industry President Yevgeny Primakov. The Ugandan leader also visited the International Aviation and Space Salon MAKS-2009 in Zhukovsky, the Kubinka Tank Museum, the company-manufacturer of equipment for the food industry. On June 6, 2011, the President of the Russian Federation Dmitry Medvedev and the President of Uganda Yoweri Museveni had a telephone conversation.  The country has a representation of the Kazan Helicopter Plant, is a group of Russian experts on operation and maintenance of helicopters. In February 2011, a group of observers from the Russian Central Election Commission worked in the general elections in Uganda.

Trade 
In 2010, the trade turnover, according to the Federal Customs Service of Russia totalled $49 million.

Between 2013 and 2020 Ukraine mainly imported cereals from Russia with values of $30-90m per annum.

References

External links
  Documents on the Russia–Uganda relationship from the Russian Ministry of Foreign Affairs
  Embassy of Uganda in Moscow

 
Uganda
Uganda
Bilateral relations of Uganda